Albert Hoffmann (24 October 1907 – 26 August 1972) was a German entrepreneur and during the Third Reich the Nazi Gauleiter of Westphalia-South.

Early life
After his apprenticeship, he first took up a job as a raw tobacco salesman.  In 1925 Hoffmann joined the National Socialist Worker Youth (Nationalsozialistische Arbeiterjugend) and was among the founding members of the SA and Nazi Party in Bremen. He also worked as a propaganda leader in the Oldenburg area.

Nazi career 1933-1945
Shortly after Adolf Hitler's seizure of power, Hoffmann gave up his profession, entered full-time party work and held functions in the NSDAP's Bremen District Leadership, until he was appointed a Political Leader on Rudolf Hess's staff in July 1934 and went to work at the Brown House in Munich.  In November 1936, Hoffmann joined the SS. He was appointed Stillhaltekommissar for Austria and later also in the Sudetenland and the Protectorate of Bohemia and Moravia, which mainly involved taking care of property law matters. At the same time, he was responsible for building up the Party in the aforesaid areas.

In the summer of 1939, Hoffmann underwent military training and, assigned as an unteroffizier of reserves, participated actively in the Invasion of Poland. On 10 February 1941, while retaining his other functions, he was made Deputy Gauleiter of the recently established Gau Upper Silesia and, on 3 June, also gained a seat in the Reichstag representing electoral constituency 17 (Breslau).

From May to September 1942 he served as Martin Bormann's representative on General Walter von Unruh's staff, seeking to mobilize for total war and replenish losses of manpower. In this capacity, he traveled widely through the occupied eastern territories, including the General Government, Ostland and Ukraine. Hoffmann advised Hitler on the Holocaust. He gave insights into actions of the Einsatzgruppen murders and on the death camps of Operation Reinhard, on which he spoke at the Reich Chancellery. He made suggestions for improvement, or Verbesserungsvorschlägen, to Hitler and Joseph Goebbels.

"In the course of the travel of the DB by the "eastern territories", Hoffmann won deep insights in the extermination of the Jews, Germanization policies, and the brutal measures to recruit "Eastern workers." To leading representatives of the "Final Solution", including the General Governor of Poland, Hans Frank, and Odilo Globocnik, head of Operation Reinhard. He had to portray the work processes and "successes" of their campaigns. In his reports to Bormann, who came to discuss it with Goebbels and Hitler, Hoffmann forged the image of a ruthless occupation policy. (trans. from German)

On 26 January 1943 Hoffmann was appointed Acting Gauleiter of Westphalia-South, when Paul Giesler took up new duties in Gau Munich-Upper Bavaria. At the same time, Hoffmann also was made Reich Defense Commissioner for his Gau. On 1 August he was named to the Prussian State Council. On 9 November he was promoted to SS-Gruppenführer. In December of the same year, Hoffmann was appointed Deputy to Joseph Goebbels in his capacity as Reich Inspector for Civil Aerial Warfare Measures. On 17 April 1944, Hofmann was made permanent Gauleiter of Westphalia-South. On 25 September 1944 he was placed in command of the Volksturm units in his jurisdiction. In October he was named Reich Defense Commissioner for the Rhine and Ruhr regions.

Hoffmann, who did not enjoy widespread popularity even within the Nazi Party's top ranks owing to his arrogance and bossy manner, was said to have been a staunch Nazi right through to the war's end. Shortly before the war ended, as Allied troops were invading his jurisdiction, he ordered the destruction of numerous bridges and other infrastructure. Finally, on 13 April 1945, Hoffmann dissolved his Gau staff and the Volkssturm organization in Westphalia-South and went into hiding.

Post-war trial, conviction, and sentence
Hoffmann was finally discovered and arrested by British troops on 4 October 1945. He testified as a witness to atrocities in the Nuremberg Trials and was later himself charged in connection with the murders of Allied soldiers and foreign forced labourers. He was acquitted for lack of evidence.  However, he was then tried by a German De-Nazification Court and received a prison sentence of 4 years and 9 months, only part of which he served, receiving a pardon.

Later life and family
After his release in April 1950, Hoffmann earned considerable assets as an entrepreneur in Bremen.  Hoffmann was married. His son Bolko Hoffmann is likewise a successful entrepreneur and the founder of the Pro DM Party, a rightwing, conservative fringe party in Germany whose main policy is to campaign for the reintroduction of the Deutsche Mark.

References

Literature
Ralf Blank: Albert Hoffmann, in: Westfälische Lebensbilder 17, Münster 2005 [= Veröffentlichungen der Historischen Kommission für Westfalen XXVII A, 17].
Ralf Blank: Albert Hoffmann als Reichsverteidigungskommissar im Gau Westfalen-Süd, 1943-1945. Eine biografische Skizze, in: Beiträge zur Geschichte des Nationalsozialismus 17 (2001), S. 189-210.
Ralf Blank: "... der Volksempörung nicht zu entziehen". Gauleiter Albert Hoffmann und der "Fliegerbefehl", in: Märkisches Jahrbuch 98 (1998), S. 255-296.

External links
Detailed Biography by Ralf Blank (in German)
Online-Biography of Albert Hoffmann (in German)

1907 births
1972 deaths
Gauleiters
Members of the Reichstag of Nazi Germany
Nazi Party officials
Nazi Party politicians
Nazi propagandists
Military personnel from Bremen
Protectorate of Bohemia and Moravia
Recipients of the Knights Cross of the War Merit Cross
SS-Gruppenführer
Volkssturm personnel